The 2024 United States Senate election in Texas will be held on November 5, 2024, to elect a member of the United States Senate to represent the state of Texas. Incumbent Republican Senator Ted Cruz is running for re-election to a third term in office, but says he may also run for president, and has long advocated for congressional term limits.

Republican primary

Candidates

Declared
 Ted Cruz, incumbent U.S. Senator (2013–present)

Declined

Democratic primary

Candidates

Declared
John Love III, financial advisor, former Midland mayor pro tempore, and candidate for U.S. Senate in 2020

Filed paperwork
Aaron Arguijo, coffee shop owner and U.S. Navy veteran
Teresa Naranjo
Heli Rodriguez-Prilliman, investor
Sherri Lynn Taylor

Potential
Julián Castro, former U.S. Secretary of Housing and Urban Development (2014–2017), former Mayor of San Antonio (2009–2014), and candidate for President of the United States in 2020
Roland Gutierrez, state senator (2021–present)
Gregg Popovich, head coach for the San Antonio Spurs
James Talarico, state representative (2019–present)
Sylvester Turner, mayor of Houston (2016–present) and former state representative (1989–2016)

Green primary

Candidates

Filed paperwork
Mason Cysewski

General election

Predictions

Notes

References

External links
Official campaign websites
Ted Cruz (R) for Senate
John Love III (D) for Senate
Heli Rodriguez-Prilliman (D) for Senate

2024
Texas
United States Senate